Ingelsvatnet or Ingjelsvatnet is a lake in the municipality of Lierne in Trøndelag county, Norway. The water flows out through a series of small lakes and streams that lead into Tunnsjøen.

See also
List of lakes in Norway

References

Lierne
Lakes of Trøndelag